In the mathematical area of graph theory, a cage is a regular graph that has as few vertices as possible for its girth.

It follows that all  exist.

If a Moore graph exists with degree  and girth , it must be a cage. Moreover, the bounds on the sizes of Moore graphs generalize to cages: any cage with odd girth  must have at least

vertices, and any cage with even girth  must have at least

vertices. Any  with exactly this many vertices is by definition a Moore graph and therefore automatically a cage.

For instance there are three nonisomorphic , each with 70 vertices: the Balaban 10-cage, the Harries graph and the Harries–Wong graph. But there is only one : the Balaban 11-cage (with 112 vertices).

Known cages 
A 1-regular graph has no cycle, and a connected 2-regular graph has girth equal to its number of vertices, so cages are only of interest for r ≥ 3. The (r,3)-cage is a complete graph Kr+1 on r+1 vertices, and the (r,4)-cage is a complete bipartite graph Kr,r on 2r vertices.

Notable cages include:
 (3,5)-cage: the Petersen graph, 10 vertices
 (3,6)-cage: the Heawood graph, 14 vertices
 (3,7)-cage: the McGee graph, 24 vertices
 (3,8)-cage: the Tutte–Coxeter graph, 30 vertices
 (3,10)-cage: the Balaban 10-cage, 70 vertices
 (3,11)-cage: the Balaban 11-cage, 112 vertices
 (4,5)-cage: the Robertson graph, 19 vertices
 (7,5)-cage: The Hoffman–Singleton graph, 50 vertices.
 When r − 1 is a prime power, the (r,6) cages are the incidence graphs of projective planes.
 When r − 1 is a prime power, the (r,8) and (r,12) cages are generalized polygons.

The numbers of vertices in the known (r,g) cages, for values of r > 2 and g > 2, other than projective planes and generalized polygons, are:

Asymptotics 
For large values of g, the Moore bound implies that the number n of vertices must grow at least singly exponentially as a function of g. Equivalently, g can be at most proportional to the logarithm of n. More precisely,

It is believed that this bound is tight or close to tight . The best known lower bounds on g are also logarithmic, but with a smaller constant factor (implying that n grows singly exponentially but at a higher rate than the Moore bound). Specifically, the construction of Ramanujan graphs defined by  satisfy the bound
 

It is unlikely that these graphs are themselves cages, but their existence gives an upper bound to the number of vertices needed in a cage.

References 
.
.
.
.
.
.
.
.
.

External links 

 Brouwer, Andries E. Cages
 Royle, Gordon. Cubic Cages and Higher valency cages

Graph families
Regular graphs